De la Rosa is a Spanish surname, which means "of the rose". The name De la Rosa (or variants of the name) may refer to:

People with the name De la Rosa 
Dane De La Rosa (born 1983), American baseball player
Domingo Vega de la Rosa (born 1953), Spanish painter
Eduardo Verano de la Rosa (born 1950), Colombian politician
Erika de la Rosa (born 1980), Mexican actress
Eury De La Rosa (born 1990), Dominican baseball player
Francisco de la Rosa (1966–2011), Dominican baseball player
Jaime de la Rosa (1921–1992), Filipino actor 
James de la Rosa (born 1987), Mexican boxer
Javier de la Rosa (born 1947), Spanish businessman
Jesús de la Rosa (born 1953), Dominican baseball player
Jorge de la Rosa (born 1981), Mexican baseball player
José de la Rosa, Mexican musician
Lenny de la Rosa (born 1983), Cuban actor
Nelson de la Rosa (1968–2006), Dominican actor
Oscar De La Rosa (born 1960), American singer
Pedro de la Rosa (born 1971), Spanish racing driver
Rodrigo de la Rosa (born 1982), Mexican actor
Rogelio de la Rosa (1916–1986), Filipino politician
Rolando de la Rosa (born 1953), Filipino educator
Rubby De La Rosa (born 1989), Dominican baseball player
Secun de la Rosa (born 1969), Spanish actor 
Tomás de la Rosa (born 1978), Dominican baseball player
Tony de la Rosa (1931–2004), Mexican-American musician
Tony De La Rosa, guitarist for the band Renegade

People with the name Dela Rosa 
Camille Dela Rosa (born 1982), Filipino painter
Lita dela Rosa (died 1994), Filipino ten-pin bowling player
Rome dela Rosa (born 1990), Filipino basketball player
Ronald dela Rosa (born 1962), Filipino police officer; Director General of the Director of the Bureau of Corrections in 2018

People with the name Delarosa 
Yvonne DeLaRosa, American actress

See also 
Hayim de lah Rozah, Spanish rabbi 
 Dela Rosa (disambiguation)

Spanish-language surnames